Caroline Chisholm College is an independent Roman Catholic comprehensive single-sex secondary day school for girls, located in Glenmore Park, a western suburb of Sydney, New South Wales, Australia. The college is administered by the Catholic Education Office of the Diocese of Parramatta. The school is named in honor of Caroline Chisholm, a pioneer in Australian history and social reformer.

History
The school was established in 1974 and opened with only 20 students and 5 staff members. In 1976, the school was moved to its present site in Glenmore Park. From 1976 - 1997, the school only educated girls from grades 7-10. In 1997, a restructure was made to transform the school into a college, at which time it began enrolling students for years 11 and 12.

The school currently enrols over 1000 students with over 70 full-time and part-time teachers. Although the majority of the student body was born in Australia, many others come from other countries such as the Philippines and Malta.

The students are particularly involved in social justice, raising money for various organizations such as the St. Vincent de Paul Society and World Vision , Caritas Australia, Mamie and Penrith Community Kitchen.

From 1998 to 2002, the school underwent a campaign to improve the campus facilities. The previous principal Christine Howe along with current Assistant principal Gregory King have also significantly promoted technology in the classroom, with substantial funds spent on computers and teacher training.

Houses 
The following houses compete for the House Cup, in annual swimming carnivals, cross country events, athletics carnival and other academic areas.

See also 

List of Catholic schools in New South Wales
Catholic education in the Diocese of Parramatta
 Catholic education in Australia

References

External links
Caroline Chisholm College
Catholic Education Office

Girls' schools in New South Wales
Catholic secondary schools in Sydney
Roman Catholic Diocese of Parramatta
Educational institutions established in 1974
1974 establishments in Australia
Alliance of Girls' Schools Australasia